The discography of American rock band Bear Hands consists of four studio albums, two extended plays (EPs), and eight singles. Bear Hands was formed in 2006 while band members Dylan Rau met Ted Feldman attended Wesleyan University, and were later joined by Loper and Orscher through their previous bands, who were involved in the local hardcore punk scene.

Studio albums

Extended plays
 Golden EP (2007)
 Songs From Utopia Vol. 1 (2012)

Singles

Notes

References

External links 

Rock music group discographies